"Crawling Back to You" is a song from American rock band Daughtry's third studio album Break the Spell (2011). It was released on October 3, 2011 as the lead pop single and second overall single off the album. Chris Daughtry co-wrote the song with Marti Frederiksen, while Howard Benson served as the record's producer.

The song was a modest chart success, reaching number 41 on the Billboard Hot 100 and number six on the Adult Pop Songs chart. It was also the band's second entry on the Japan Hot 100, reaching 24. In Canada, the song charted at 36, surpassing the chart peak of lead single, "Renegade". Ultimately, it was the only single off Break the Spell to enter the Hot 100.

Background and release
"Crawling Back to You" was originally recorded for Daughtry's second album, Leave This Town, in 2009, but was left off the final track listing. While working on Break the Spell in 2011, Chris Daughtry returned to the song and worked with co-writer Marti Frederiksen to tweak the chorus; this revised version was then re-recorded and included on the album.

The song and "Renegade" were made available for a free listen on the band's official website on September 19, 2011. It was officially released to digital retailers through RCA Records on October 3. It impacted American mainstream radio on October 25, 2011.

Music video
The music video premiered on October 26, 2011 and was directed by Laurent Briet. It focuses on the band as they perform the song in an abandoned parking lot. The band relied upon "weird" camera angles and post-production effects to add interest.

Commercial performance

"Crawling Back to You" debuted at number 41 on the US Billboard Hot 100 chart dated October 22, 2011, with sales of 47,000. It was the highest-ranking debut of the week as well as Daughtry's third-highest debut, behind "No Surprise" (15) and "What About Now" (18). It spent ten weeks on the chart, with 41 remaining its peak. The song fared better at radio, reaching number six on the Adult Pop Songs chart and number 14 on the Adult Contemporary chart, both in 2012.

The song debuted at number 36 on the Canadian Hot 100 chart dated October 22, 2011. In Japan, the song was their second charting single, entering the Japan Hot 100 at number 24 on the chart dated February 4, 2012.

Chart positions

Weekly charts

Year end charts

Release history

References

2011 singles
Daughtry (band) songs
Rock ballads
Songs written by Marti Frederiksen
Song recordings produced by Howard Benson
Songs written by Chris Daughtry
2011 songs
RCA Records singles